Recipes for Love and Murder is a South African dark comedy mystery television series based on the novels by Sally Andrew. The first two episodes screened at the 72nd Berlinale Series Market. It began airing on 20 March 2022 on M-Net. Distributed by MultiChoice and Global Screen, and was released internationally on Acorn TV on 5 September.

Cast

Main

Supporting

Recurring
 Robyn Scott as Aileen McClintock
 Loren Loubser as Lucille
 Richard Wright-Firth as Gordon McClintock
 Ashley Dowds as Mickey Purvis
 Melissa de Vries as Nurse Christine
 Evan Hengst as Stefan

Episodes

Production
The series is produced by Thierry Cassuto's Both Worlds Pictures in association with the Scotland-based Pirate Productions with support from Creative Scotland and Paradoxal. The novel was adapted for television by Karen Jeynes and Annie Griffin, and the show was directed by Christiaan Olwagen and along with Jeynes. Jenny Williams of Pirate produced alongside Cassuto. Executive producers include Jeynes of Both Worlds, Catherine Mackin and Lesley Pemberton of Acorn, and Yolisa Phahle, Allan Sperling, and Jan du Plessis of M-Net.

Principal photography took place on location in Cape Town, Prince Albert in the Karoo region of the Western Cape, as well as in Edinburgh.

References

External links
 
 Recipes for Love and Murder at TVSA
 Recipes for Love and Murder at M-Net

2020s Scottish television series
2020s South African television series
2022 South African television series debuts
Acorn TV original programming
Crime comedy television series
M-Net original programming
Murder in television
Television shows based on novels
Works about chefs
Works based on South African novels